The R294 road is a regional road in counties Roscommon, Mayo, and Sligo in Ireland.

The government legislation that defines the R294, the Roads Act 1993 (Classification of Regional Roads) Order 2012 (Statutory Instrument 54 of 2012), provides the following official description:

Boyle, County Roscommon — Tobercurry, County Sligo — Ballina, County Mayo

Between its junction with N4 at Kilbryan and its junction with N61 at Carrick Road in the town of Boyle via Warren all in the county of Roscommon

and

between its junction with N61 at Bridge Street in the town of Boyle in the county of Roscommon and its junction with N17 at Station Road Tobercurry in the county of Sligo via Patrick Street in the town of Boyle; and Mocmoyne in the county of Roscommon: Mullaghroe, Gorteen, Rathmadder, Knocknaskeagh, Quarryfield; Emmett Street, Wolfe Tone Square and Teeling Street at Tobercurry in the county of Sligo

and

between its junction with N17 at Circular Road Tobercurry in the county of Sligo and its junction with N59 at Cathedral Road in the town of Ballina via Station Road at Tobercurry; Drummartin and Largan in the county of Sligo: Bunnyconnellan, Behy and Ardnaree in the county of Mayo: and Abbey Street in the town of Ballina.

and

between its junction with N59 at Emmet Street and N59 at Teeling Street in the town of Ballina via Bridge Street O’Rahilly Street and Bury Street (and via Garden Street and Tone Street) in the town of Ballina.

See also
 List of roads of County Mayo
 National primary road
 National secondary road
 Regional road
 Roads in Ireland

References

Regional roads in the Republic of Ireland
Roads in County Mayo
Roads in County Roscommon
Roads in County Sligo